Luis Enrique Vidal Gimó (30 March 1916 – 27 February 1999) was a Chilean footballer who played as a centre back.

Career
At the age of 10, Vidal played for Colegio San Agustín. A year later, he joined Unión Deportiva Española youth system. He was promoted to the first team in 1933 and made his professional debut in 1936. In 1939, he switched to Universidad Católica, winning the 1949 Primera División, despite the fact that he was injured. In both Unión Española and Universidad Católica, he coincided with Fernando Riera, whom he nicknamed Tata (In Chile, an informal form for Grandfather).

At international level, he played in three matches for the Chile national team in 1941, being part of Chile's squad for the 1941 South American Championship.

As manager of Universidad Católica, he won the 1966 Primera División. He also was the coach of Deportes La Calera, O'Higgins, and Emelec

Personal life
He was nicknamed Huacho, an informal way how Chileans refer to orphans.

Honours

Player
Universidad Católica
 Chilean Primera División: 1949

Manager
Universidad Católica
 Chilean Primera División: 1966

References

External links
 
 Luis Vidal at PartidosdeLaRoja 
 

1916 births
1999 deaths
Chilean footballers
Chile international footballers
Unión Española footballers
Club Deportivo Universidad Católica footballers
Association football defenders
Chilean football managers
Unión La Calera managers
Club Deportivo Universidad Católica managers
O'Higgins F.C. managers
C.S. Emelec managers
Primera B de Chile managers
Chilean Primera División managers
Chilean expatriate football managers
Chilean expatriate sportspeople in Ecuador
Expatriate football managers in Ecuador
Place of birth missing
Place of death missing